The seventh annual Premios MTV Latinoamérica 2008 took place on October 16, 2008 in Guadalajara, Mexico at the Auditorio Telmex for the first time.

Jose Tillan was the Executive Producer of the event.

Nominations

Winners are in bold text

Artist of the Year
 Babasónicos
 Belanova
 Café Tacuba
 Juanes
 Miranda!

Video of the Year
 Babasónicos — "Pijamas"
 Belanova — "One, Two, Three, Go! (1, 2, 3, Go!)"
 Café Tacuba — "Esta Vez"
 Juanes — "Me Enamora"
 Motel — "Uno, Dos, Tres"

Song of the Year
 Jonas Brothers — "When You Look Me in the Eyes"
 Juanes — "Me Enamora"
 Julieta Venegas — "El Presente"
 Katy Perry — "I Kissed a Girl"
 Tokio Hotel — "Monsoon"

Best Solo Artist
 Diego
 Emmanuel Horvilleur
 Gustavo Cerati
 Juanes
 Ximena Sariñana

Best Group or Duet
 Babasónicos
 Belanova
 Café Tacuba
 Kudai
 Miranda!

Best Pop Artist
 Belanova
 Jesse & Joy
 Kudai
 Miranda!
 Ximena Sariñana

Best Rock Artist
 Babasónicos
 Gustavo Cerati
 Juanes
 Moderatto
 Motel

Best Alternative Artist
 Café Tacuba
 Emmanuel Horvilleur
 Kinky
 Molotov
 Zoé

Best Pop Artist — International
 Amy Winehouse
 Fergie
 Jonas Brothers
 Madonna
 Rihanna

Best Rock Artist — International
 Thirty Seconds to Mars
 Coldplay
 Fall Out Boy
 Panic! at the Disco
 Paramore

Best New Artist — International
 Alizée
 Jonas Brothers
 Katy Perry
 Paramore
 Tokio Hotel

Best Artist — North
 Belanova
 Café Tacuba
 Motel
 Ximena Sariñana
 Zoé

Best Artist — Central
 Doctor Krápula
 Don Tetto
 Juanes
 Kudai
 Los Bunkers

Best Artist — South
 Andrés Calamaro
 Babasónicos
 Catupecu Machu
 Emmanuel Horvilleur
 Miranda!

Breakthrough Artist
 Don Tetto
 El Bordo
 Johanna Carreño
 Shaila
 Ximena Sariñana

Promising Artist
 Esto es Eso
 Infierno 18
 Insite
 Le Baron
 Smitten

Fashionista Award — Female
 Denisse Guerrero (from Belanova)
 Gabriela Villalba (from Kudai)
 Hayley Williams (from Paramore)
 Katy Perry
 Rihanna

Fashionista Award — Male
 Alejandro Sergi (from Miranda!)
 Bill Kaulitz (from Tokio Hotel)
 Jay de la Cueva (from Moderatto)
 Joe Jonas (from the Jonas Brothers)
 José "Pepe" Madero (from Panda)

Best Fan Club
 Thirty Seconds to Mars (President: Iris Delgado)
 Babasónicos (President: Juan Laborda)
 Belanova (President: Luis Nazario)
 Jonas Brothers (President: Miguel Alejandro Villa Renteria)
 Kudai (President: Martín Torrilla)
 Tokio Hotel (President: Fátima Acosta)

Best Video Game Soundtrack
 FIFA 08
 Grand Theft Auto IV
 Guitar Hero III: Legends of Rock
 Need for Speed: ProStreet
 Rock Band

Best Ringtone
 Jonas Brothers — "When You Look Me in the Eyes"
 Juanes — "Tres"
 Julieta Venegas — "El Presente"
 Madonna — "4 Minutes"
 Tokio Hotel — "Monsoon"

Best Music Film
 Across the Universe
 Control
 I'm Not There
 Shine a Light
 U2 3D

Best Reunion Tour
 Soda Stereo
 The Police

La Zona de Combate
 Moving On
 Pinkat
 Toke Rosa

MTV Legend Award
 Los Fabulosos Cadillacs

Performances

Pre-show
 Emmanuel Horvilleur — "Radios"
 Don Tetto — "Ha Vuelto a Suceder"
 The Kooks — "Do You Wanna"

Main show
 Julieta Venegas (featuring Nortec Collective) — "El Presente"
 Tokio Hotel — "Monsoon"
 Paramore — "That's What You Get"
 Los Fabulosos Cadillacs — "La Luz del Ritmo" and "Matador" (live from Argentina)
 Café Tacuba and Calle 13 (featuring Ileana Cabra) — "Vámonos" / "No Hay Nadie Como Tú"
 Juanes — "Odio Por Amor"
 Katy Perry — "I Kissed a Girl"
 Belanova — "One, Two, Three, Go! (1, 2, 3, Go!)"
 Zoé and Ximena Sariñana — "Reptilectric" / "Vidas Paralelas"
 Moderatto and Kudai — "Ya Lo Veía Venir" / "Lejos De Aquí"
 Metallica — "The Day That Never Comes"
 Moving On — "AudioRomance"

Appearances
Tila Tequila — presented Best Solo Artist
The Dudesons — introduced Paramore
Hayley Williams (from Paramore) — introduced Los Fabulosos Cadillacs
Kim Kardashian, Brian Amadeus and Xavi (from Moderatto) — presented Song of the Year and introduced the next presenters
Flavor Flav and Alejandra Guzmán — presented Best Pop Artist and introduced Café Tacuba
Ana Claudia Talancón and Babasónicos — presented Best Rock Artist — International and introduced the next presenters
Arturo Hernández and Gonzalo Morales — presented Best Fan Club and introduced Juanes
Miranda! — introduced Juanes with Arturo and Gonzalo
Eglantina Zingg — interviewed Gene Simmons in a segment before commercials
Gene Simmons — introduced Katy Perry
Ximena Sariñana, José Madero (from Panda) and Dante Spinetta — presenting Best Alternative Artist
Andrés López — presented Belanova with The Dudesons
Katy Perry and René Pérez (from Calle 13) — introduced Thirty Seconds to Mars
Thirty Seconds to Mars — presented Video of the Year
Ruth Infarinato and Alejandro Lacroix — introduced Zoé, Ximena Sariñana, Mario Pergolini, Kudai and Moderatto (in three separate instances)
Mario Pergolini — presented the MTV Legend Award
Molotov — presented Artist of the Year
Juanes — introduced Metallica
Dante Spinetta — introduced Moving On

Memorable Moments
 While performing "I Kissed a Girl", Katy Perry jumped on a fake cake and when she tried to get up she slipped several times. She crawled off the stage.

External links
 Los Premios MTV 2008 official website

References

Latin American music
MTV Video Music Awards
2008 music awards